Stanley Aniagyei Ampaw (born 26 December 2002) is a Ghanaian professional footballer who plays as a central midfielder for Étoile Sportive du Sahel.

Career 
Ampaw started his playing career with Accra Hearts of Oak playing in the club's under-17 side, Royal Oaks till he was promoted to the under-20 side, Auroras in August 2018. In 2020, he moved to fellow Accra-based team Liberty Professionals. During the 2020–21 season, he played 21 league matches and was one of the standout players within the season.

In January 2022, he joined Tunisian club Étoile Sportive du Sahel on a one-year loan deal.

On 2 March 2022, he made his debut coming on for Iheb Msakni as a 78th minute substitute against Soliman, scoring the second goal in a 2–0 home victory in the Tunisian Ligue Professionnelle.

References

External links 
 
 
 

2002 births
Living people
Ghanaian footballers
Association football midfielders
Accra Hearts of Oak S.C. players
Étoile Sportive du Sahel players
Ghanaian expatriate footballers
Expatriate footballers in Tunisia
Ghanaian expatriate sportspeople in Tunisia
Liberty Professionals F.C. players